Nikolaos Venetopoulos (born 12 April 1969) is a Greek former water polo player who competed in the 1988 Summer Olympics and in the 1992 Summer Olympics.

References

1969 births
Living people
Greek male water polo players
Olympiacos Water Polo Club players
Olympic water polo players of Greece
Water polo players at the 1988 Summer Olympics
Water polo players at the 1992 Summer Olympics
Water polo players from Thessaloniki